Baidyanath Mukhopadhyay was an educationist, born in Calcutta, and a social reformer during the Bengal Renaissance, who contributed to the foundation of the Hindu School.

References

Bengali Hindus
Bengali educators
19th-century Bengalis
People from Kolkata
19th-century Indian educational theorists
Indian educators
Educators from West Bengal
19th-century Indian educators
Indian educational theorists